Walrond is a surname. Notable people with the surname include:

Edmund Walrond (1655–1708), English Member of Parliament
Emma Maria Walrond (1859–1943), New Zealand painter
Eric D. Walrond (1898–1966), Harlem Renaissance writer
Humphrey Walrond (c. 1600 – c. 1670), deputy governor of Barbados
Sir John Walrond (1818-1889), British politician
Les Walrond (b. 1976), American baseball player
Violet Walrond (1905–1996), New Zealand Olympic swimmer
William Walrond, 1st Baron Waleran (1849–1925), British peer
William Walrond (politician) (1876–1915), Member of Parliament; son of the above